Anton Anatolyevich Kushniruk (born 30 June 1995) is a Russian football defender. He plays for FC Novosibirsk.

Club career
He made his debut in the Russian Second Division for FC Sibir-2 Novosibirsk on 5 June 2013 in a game against FC Sibiryak Bratsk.

He made his Russian Football National League debut for FC Sibir Novosibirsk on 11 July 2016 in a game against FC Spartak-2 Moscow.

In 2020, Kushniruk moved to FC Akzhayik in Kazakhstan.

References

External links
 Career summary by sportbox.ru

1995 births
Sportspeople from Novosibirsk
Living people
Russian footballers
Association football defenders
FC Sibir Novosibirsk players
FC Akzhayik players
FC Dynamo Stavropol players
Russian First League players
Russian Second League players
Kazakhstan First Division players
Russian expatriate footballers
Russian expatriate sportspeople in Kazakhstan
Expatriate footballers in Kazakhstan